The Grammy Award for Best Contemporary R&B Gospel Album was an honor presented at the Grammy Awards, a ceremony that was established in 1958 and originally called the Gramophone Awards, to recording artists for quality gospel albums incorporating contemporary R&B music. Honors in several categories are presented at the ceremony annually by the National Academy of Recording Arts and Sciences of the United States to "honor artistic achievement, technical proficiency and overall excellence in the recording industry, without regard to album sales or chart position." In 1991, the award originated as Best Contemporary Soul Gospel Album, and renamed in 2007.  Previously, a similar award, the Grammy Award for Best Soul Gospel Performance, Contemporary, was given from 1978 to 1983.

According to the category description guide for the 52nd Grammy Awards, the award is presented to "a newly recorded album with at least fifty-one percent R&B Gospel vocal tracks. A solo artist with a choir or chorus is eligible when the choir/chorus provides backing on what is considered an album for the solo artist."

The award was discontinued in 2012 in a major overhaul of Grammy categories. From 2012 forward, recordings in this category have been shifted to the Best Gospel Album category.

Recipients
Years reflect the year in which the Grammy Awards were presented, for works released in the previous year.

 Each year is linked to the article about the Grammy Awards held that year.

Record holders

Most Wins

Most Nominations

See also
 Grammy Award for Best Gospel Album
 Grammy Award for Best Rock Gospel Album
 List of Grammy Award categories

References

General
 

Specific

External links
Official site of the Grammy Awards

Grammy Awards for gospel music
Contemporary RandB Gospel Album
Album awards